Dyserth is a village, community and electoral ward in Denbighshire, Wales. Its population at the 2011 United Kingdom census was 2,269 and was estimated by the Office for National Statistics as 2,271 in 2019. It lies within the historic county boundaries of Flintshire. Features include quarrying remains, waterfalls and the mountain Moel Hiraddug. Its railway line, once part of the London and North Western Railway, finally closed in 1973 and is now a footpath.

Overview
Dyserth is mentioned in the Domesday book of 1086, listed in the Hundred of Ati's Cross and within Cheshire:

Dyserth also had a nearby castle, which suffered at the hands of Llywelyn ap Gruffudd; destroyed after a six-week siege in 1263. The remains of the castle were quarried away during World War I.

The oldest industry in the village and surrounding area is mining, with lead, copper and limestone just some of the minerals being mined locally in the past. These quarries are still visible and form a major part of the village's geography, though mining ceased when Dyserth Quarry closed in 1981.

Traditionally, there has been a strong Welsh language speaking community in the village and until recent times many families and village folk knew, or knew of, each other. This is typical of a rural community whose life often centred on its many churches and chapels. Many of the village's families have their roots in agriculture, with many notable farms in or around Dyserth, including Hottia, Bryn Cnewyllyn and Ty Newydd.

Places of worship
The Parish Church of St Bridget and St Cwyfan, of the Church in Wales (the Wales based churches of the Anglican Communion), is a Grade II* listed building. The church is dedicated to Saint Brigid of Kildare, and includes the name of the Celtic monk Saint Cwyfan, believed to have founded the original place of worship near the Dyserth Waterfall during the 6th century. The church is notable for a Jesse Window dating from the 16th century.

Dyserth Chapel, in Dyserth High Street, built in 1927, also has stained glass. It houses the English-speaking Horeb United Reformed Church.

Railway

The Dyserth branch line was opened by the London and North Western Railway in 1869 to tap limestone quarries and a lead mine. A passenger, parcels and goods service was introduced in 1905 to serve local needs and an expanding holiday industry. The company designed and built a single carriage, steam-powered Motor Train for such lines, with the Dyserth Branch using the first example. The passenger service was a success before the First World War. Services were doubled and an additional unit provided for the motor trains. After the war the motor trains were replaced by locomotive-propelled push-pull trains. Road competition and the 1926 General Strike ate into profits, leading the London, Midland and Scottish Railway to withdraw the passenger service in 1930.

Coal traffic ended in May 1964, with lime and limestone traffic continuing until the line officially closed completely on 7 September 1973, although at least two special trains took stone away in 1974.

The tracks were lifted in 1980, with the former trackbed now converted into a mixed-use footpath and bridleway.

People of note
 Layton Maxwell (1979– ), footballer
 John Roberts (1853–1949), missionary
  Mike Peters (1959- )

References

Bibliography

External links

http://www.dyserth.com
Journal newspaper covering Dyserth
Geograph (photos of Dyserth and surrounding area)

Villages in Denbighshire
Wards of Denbighshire